American rapper, singer and record producer Kitty has released two studio albums, one mixtape, two compilation albums, ten extended plays, and twenty-eight singles (including four as a featured artist). Kitty began rapping in 2010, and shared her music online under the stage name Kitty Pryde. In 2011, she served as a member of hip-hop group Jokers in Trousers. The group released a self-titled EP, which would be their only release before disbanding. In July 2011, Kitty released a solo mixtape titled The Lizzie McGuire Experience.

Kitty released her first EP, Haha, I'm Sorry, in June 2012. The EP was preceded by the single "Okay Cupid", which became an internet sensation. A second EP, titled D.A.I.S.Y. Rage, was released in January 2013. It would be Kitty's first release under her current mononym stage name. The EP spawned the singles "Hittin Lix", "☠Dead❤Island☠" and "Ay Shawty 3.0".

In 2014, Kitty released three extended plays. The first, Impatiens, was released in May. An outtake, titled "Marijuana", was released as a single the following month. In June, Kitty released Don't Let Me Do This Again, an EP made up of cover songs. The final extended play, Frostbite, was released in November. The EP saw Kitty move away from her hip-hop beginnings, and opt to experiment with trance and electro music. It includes the pre-singles "Second Life", "285", and "Miss U".

Kitty began working on her debut studio album in 2015. The album, Miami Garden Club, was crowdfunded by fans and released in August 2017. Stylistically, it was influenced by '80s and '90s pop music. To promote the album, Kitty released the single "Asari Love Song" as part of the Adult Swim Singles Program 2016. The album also features Kitty's Adult Swim single from 2015, "Drink Tickets". Two album tracks—the title track and "Mass Text Booty Call"—received music videos.

In July 2018, Kitty announced that her second album would be titled Rose Gold. The first single, "Counting All the Starfish", was released via Bandcamp on September 30, 2018. On February 26, 2017, Kitty shared a new track from Rose Gold titled "Disconnect", and revealed that the album would be released in April 2019. The album was made available to pre-order on March 22, 2019, and was released on April 5.

Kitty released an extended play titled Charm and Mirror in June 2020. It was preceded by the single "Baby Pink".

Since 2016, Kitty has worked on a number of music projects alongside her husband, music producer Sam Ray. The pair formed the EDM duo 56colors in June 2016. Under this name, they have produced a number of remixes of other artists' music. Kitty and Ray have also collaborated on acoustic tracks, including the 2017 single "Hollywood". In 2018, the couple formed The Pom-Poms, their rave-pop music project. Kitty has described the project as "what happened when we decided to let go of heavy feelings and just turn the fuck up" and as "cheerleader music". The Pom-Poms' self-titled debut EP was released in September 2018. Their second EP, I Was on the News, was released in December 2019.

Albums

Studio albums

Mixtapes

Compilation albums

Extended plays

Singles

As lead artist

Promotional singles

As featured artist

Guest appearances

Remixes

Music videos

As lead artist

As featured artist

Guest appearances

References

External links
 
 
 

Discographies of American artists
Hip hop discographies